Sergei Viktorovich Shendelev (born January 19, 1964) is a retired ice hockey player who played in the Soviet Hockey League.  He played for Traktor Chelyabinsk and SKA St. Petersburg.  He was inducted into the Russian and Soviet Hockey Hall of Fame in 1993.

Career statistics

Regular season and playoffs

International

External links

 Russian and Soviet Hockey Hall of Fame bio

1964 births
EV Landsberg players
Frankfurt Lions players
Ice hockey players at the 1994 Winter Olympics
Kaufbeurer Adler players
Living people
Mad Dogs München players
Maine Mariners players
New Haven Nighthawks players
Olympic ice hockey players of Russia
Russian ice hockey defencemen
SC Bietigheim-Bissingen players
SKA Saint Petersburg players
Soviet ice hockey defencemen
Ice hockey people from Saint Petersburg
Starbulls Rosenheim players
Straubing Tigers players